The Southern Aeronautical Renegade is an American Formula V Air Racing homebuilt aircraft that was designed by Charles Lasher and produced by Southern Aeronautical Corporation of Miami Lakes, Florida. The aircraft was supplied in the form of plans for amateur construction, but the plans are apparently no longer available.

Design and development
The aircraft features a cantilever mid-wing, a single-seat enclosed cockpit under a bubble canopy, fixed conventional landing gear and a single engine in tractor configuration.

The aircraft fuselage is made from welded steel tubing, which Lasher chose for its superior crash survivability. Its mid-mounted wing has a wooden structure covered in doped aircraft fabric and spans .

Specifications (Renegade)

References

Renegade
1970s United States sport aircraft
Single-engined tractor aircraft
Mid-wing aircraft
Homebuilt aircraft